Lauri Lelumees (born 23 April 1978) is an Estonian race walker.

He was born in Tallinn. In 2002 he graduated from Tallinn Pedagogical University in managing specialty.

He started his athletics exercising in 1996, coached by Urmas Põldre. He was focused on race walking. He is 30-times Estonian champion. 2006-2017 he was a member of Estonian national athletics team.

His personal best in 10 km race walking is 42.55,6 (2007).

References

External links

Living people
1978 births
Estonian male racewalkers
Tallinn University alumni
Athletes from Tallinn